Woman on a High Stool (French: Femme au tabouret, La femme assise) is an oil painting on canvas by the French artist Henri Matisse from early 1914. It is a portrait of Germaine Raynal, the wife of the poet and art critic Maurice Raynal. With its simplified geometric structure, dark contouring, and subdued palette, the work relates closely to Paul Cézanne and Cubism.

References

Paintings by Henri Matisse
Paintings in the collection of the Museum of Modern Art (New York City)
1914 paintings